Ferdynand Ruszczyc (1870–1936) was Polish painter, printmaker, and stage designer. He was a member of the aristocratic Ruszczyc de Lis family.

Biography

Born in the village of Bohdanów (then Russian Empire, now Belarus), Ruszczyc spent his childhood in Minsk. He graduated from gymnasium in Minsk in 1890 with a gold medal. Ruszczyc originally studied law at the University of St. Petersburg, but later switched majors and began taking painting classes at the Imperial Academy of Arts. He was a student of the famous Russian landscape painters Ivan Shishkin and Arkhip Kuindzhi. Ruszczyc travelled to the Crimea to paint seascapes, and later to the Baltic islands and Sweden to paint northern landscapes. He visited Berlin, where he was significantly influenced by the Symbolist painters such as Arnold Bocklin. After graduation, Ruszczyc made extensive tours of Western Europe incorporating much of the styles he came across into his own art.

Career
One of his students was the famous Lithuanian symbolism painter M. K. Čiurlionis. In 1907–08 he held the chair of landscape painting at the Kraków Academy of Fine Arts.

In 1908, with Józef Mehoffer, Ruszczyc organized an exhibition of Polish painting in Vienna. He then settled in Vilna (Vilnius), where he devoted himself to teaching. One of his students of that time was famous Russian and Soviet sculptor Isaac Itkind. Ruszczyc also organized cultural events, and worked as a graphic designer, poster designer and illustrator. As a costume designer, he participated in several performances of the municipal theater, and he was a member of the "Committee for the Conservation of the Adam Mickiewicz Monument". In 1918 and 1919 he participated in the founding of the Faculty of Fine Arts at Stefan Batory University, where he was elected as the first dean. Czeslaw Znamierowski was one of his most notable students there.

Selected paintings

References

External links

19th-century Polish painters
19th-century Polish male artists
20th-century Polish painters
20th-century Polish male artists
People from Valozhyn District
1870 births
1936 deaths
20th-century Polish nobility
Commanders of the Order of Polonia Restituta
Commanders of the Order of Saint James of the Sword
Polish male painters